Ketovo is the name of several rural localities in Russia:
Ketovo, Kurgan Oblast, a selo in Ketovsky Selsoviet of Ketovsky District of Kurgan Oblast
Ketovo, Yaroslavl Oblast, a village in Sevastyantsevsky Rural Okrug of Breytovsky District of Yaroslavl Oblast